Robert Allen Stitt (born May 4, 1964) is an American football coach. He was the head football coach at the University of Montana, a job he held from 2015 until 2017. He previously served in the same capacity at the Colorado School of Mines from 2000 to 2014, compiling an overall record of 108–62.

Early life
Stitt was born in Tecumseh, Nebraska. After playing football, baseball, basketball, and track at Tecumseh High School in Tecumseh, he played football as a running back at Doane College, receiving the All State College Offensive Player of the Year title in 1985.

Coaching career
Stitt is widely regarded in college football as an offensive innovator because of his modernized west-coast style offense. He first studied offense at the University of Northern Colorado under Kay Dalton, receiving his master's degree there. He then returned to Doane as its offensive coordinator for four years, coaching three NAIA Division II All-Americans and 19 All-NAIA offensive players during this time. Stitt went on to coach at Austin College from 1994 to 1998, serving as the assistant head coach and the coordinator of offense and special teams, before taking a job at Harvard University as the offensive coordinator, where he set Ivy League records with a fourth place in total offense.

Colorado Mines
In 2000, Stitt was hired as the head coach at Colorado School of Mines (CSM). In 2004, CSM won the Rocky Mountain Athletic Conference (RMAC) crown. That same season, quarterback Chad Friehauf won the Harlon Hill Trophy, the equivalent to the Heisman Trophy, awarded to the best player in NCAA Division II football. In both 2006 and 2008, CSM appeared in the Dixie Rotary Bowl, and they split the RMAC title in the 2010 season with the University of Nebraska Kearney.

Montana
Stitt was announced as the 36th head coach of the University of Montana Grizzlies on December 16, 2014, to resurrect the Griz football program and take them back to the winning ways under which they played under coaches Joe Glenn, Bobby Hauck, and Don Read.

In Stitt's first football game as a Division I coach, Montana upset four-time defending FCS national champions North Dakota State 38–35 on a 1-yard run with 0:06 left on the play clock.

National media appearance
Stitt became known to people outside the CSM community, when Dana Holgorsen, the head coach at West Virginia University, gave him credit for the fly sweep play his Mountaineers team used to great success in the 2012 Orange Bowl.

Head coaching record

References

External links
 Texas State profile

1964 births
Living people
American football running backs
Austin Kangaroos football coaches
Colorado Mines Orediggers football coaches
Doane Tigers football coaches
Doane Tigers football players
Harvard Crimson football coaches
Montana Grizzlies football coaches
Nebraska Wesleyan Prairie Wolves football coaches
Northern Colorado Bears football coaches
Oklahoma State Cowboys football coaches
Texas State Bobcats football coaches
People from Tecumseh, Nebraska
Coaches of American football from Nebraska
Players of American football from Nebraska